Kuma is a rural locality (a selo) and the administrative centre of Kuminsky Selsoviet, Laksky District, Republic of Dagestan, Russia. The population was 478 as of 2010. There is 1 street.

Geography 
Kuma is located 22 km south of Kumukh (the district's administrative centre) by road, on the left bank of the Kazikumukhskoye Koysu River. Tsovkra-2 and Tsushchar are the nearest rural localities.

Nationalities 
Laks live there.

Famous residents 
 Adam Khachilayev (USSR champion in karate)
 Magomed Khachilayev (USSR champion in karate)
 Nadyr Khachiliev (State Duma deputy)
 Gulizar Sultanova (honored art worker of Russia, art critic)

References 

Rural localities in Laksky District